The 2013–14 Yale Bulldogs men's basketball team represented Yale University during the 2013–14 NCAA Division I men's basketball season. The Bulldogs, led by 15th year head coach James Jones, played their home games at John J. Lee Amphitheater of the Payne Whitney Gymnasium and were members of the Ivy League. They finished the season 19–14, 9–5 in Ivy League play to finish in second place. They were invited to the CollegeInsider.com Tournament where they defeated Quinnipiac, Holy Cross, Columbia and VMI to advance to the CIT championship game where they lost to Murray State.

Roster

Schedule

|-
!colspan=9 style="background:#00449E; color:#FFFFFF;"| Regular season

|-
!colspan=9 style="background:#00449E; color:#FFFFFF;"| CIT

References

Yale Bulldogs men's basketball seasons
Yale
Yale
Yale Bulldogs
Yale Bulldogs